Scedella dissoluta is a species of tephritid or fruit flies in the genus Scedella of the family Tephritidae.

Distribution
Eritrea, Uganda, Kenya, Tanzania, Zimbabwe, Namibia.

References

Tephritinae
Insects described in 1861
Taxa named by Hermann Loew
Diptera of Africa